Lei Lanxi (born 25 January 1998) is a Chinese badminton player from Dongguan. He won a gold medal at the 2016 BWF World Junior Championships in the mixed team event.

Early life 
Lei was born in Dongguan, Guangdong. He started playing badminton at the age of 9 and entered the Dongguan Sports School, where he received scholarship from Tang Xianhu.

Career 
In 2016, Lei competed in the 2016 BWF World Junior Championships mixed team event and was selected to play against the Armenian team in the group stage. In 2019, he won his first title at the Belarus International. He also reached the quarterfinals of the Vietnam Open. In 2021, Lei won the China National Badminton Championships in the men's singles discipline.

In 2022, he competed in the 2022 Badminton Asia Championships and qualified for the first round of the main draw, but lost to Kanta Tsuneyama in three games. He reached his second final at the 2022 Malang Indonesia International.

Achievements

BWF International Challenge/Series (1 title, 3 runners-up) 
Men's singles

  BWF International Challenge tournament
  BWF International Series tournament

References

External links 

 

Living people
1998 births
People from Dongguan
Badminton players from Guangdong
Chinese male badminton players
21st-century Chinese people